Prasiolite (also known as green quartz, green amethyst or vermarine) is a green variety of quartz. 

Since 1950, almost all natural prasiolite has come from a small Brazilian mine, but it has also been mined in the Lower Silesia region of Poland. Naturally occurring prasiolite has also been found in the Thunder Bay area of Canada. , the only commercial mine producing prasiolite is in Brazil.

Most prasiolite sold is used in jewellery settings, where it can substitute for far more expensive precious gemstones.

Prasiolite is a rare stone in nature; artificial prasiolite is produced by heat treatment of amethyst. Most amethyst will turn yellow or orange when heated, producing citrine, but some amethyst will turn green when treated. Currently, almost all prasiolite on the market results from a combination of heat treatment and ionizing radiation.

Green quartz is sometimes incorrectly called green amethyst, which is not an acceptable name for the material according to Federal Trade Commission Guidelines. Other names for green quartz include vermarine and lime citrine.

The word prasiolite literally means "scallion green-colored stone" and is derived from Greek πράσον prason meaning "leek" and λίθος lithos meaning "stone". The mineral was given its name due to its green-colored appearance.

Natural prasiolite is a very light, translucent green. Darker green quartz is generally the result of artificial treatment.

See also
 List of minerals

References

External links
– Prasiolite on Mindat.org

Quartz gemstones